Rambhai Harjibhai Mokariya is an  Indian politician. He was elected to the Rajya Sabha the upper house of Indian Parliament from Gujarat as a member of the  Bharatiya Janata Party.

References

Living people
Year of birth missing (living people)
Bharatiya Janata Party politicians from Gujarat
Rajya Sabha members from Gujarat